Schumacher is a German occupational surname.

Schumacher may also refer to:

Places
 Kurt-Schumacher-Platz (Berlin U-Bahn), a Berlin U-Bahn station
 Schumacher (crater), a moon crater
 Schumacher, Ontario, a community in the Ontario city of Timmins, Canada
 Schumacher College, a college in Devon, England
 5704 Schumacher, an asteroid

Organisations
 F. Schumacher & Co., an American interior design company
 Schumacher Racing Products, a British radio-controlled car manufacturer

See also
 Schumacher (film), a documentary film about the German Formula One racing driver Michael Schumacher

 Schumaker, a surname and list of people with the surname
 Schuey
 Shoemaker (disambiguation)